The second cabinet of Andrej Babiš was a centre-left to centre-right minority coalition government in the Czech Republic, consisting of ANO 2011, a centre-right populist political movement, and the centre-left Czech Social Democratic Party (ČSSD). The coalition received external support from the Communist Party of Bohemia and Moravia (KSČM). The head of government was Andrej Babiš, leader of ANO.

The cabinet was approved by the Chamber of Deputies on 12 July 2018 with a 105–91 vote. The Communist Party withdrew its support for the government on 13 April 2021. The government left office on 17 December 2021, and was replaced by Petr Fiala's Cabinet.

Background
The general election in 2017 was won by ANO, led by Andrej Babiš, who received 78 seats out of 200, becoming the largest party. President Miloš Zeman appointed Babiš to form a government, but all other parliamentary parties had ruled out entering a coalition with ANO due to an ongoing police investigation into Babiš's alleged subsidy fraud. In early 2018, Babiš lost a confidence vote to form an ANO minority government, with all other parties voting against. In 2018, ČSSD decided to enter coalition talks with ANO. In April, the negotiations broke down. President Miloš Zeman subsequently gave Babiš a second chance to form a government. In May, ČSSD accepted talks with ANO, with KSČM also participating to determine the conditions for its support of an ANO-ČSSD government.

Government formation
The cabinet consisted of two coalition parties. ANO, the senior coalition partner in the government, had 10 ministers (including Prime Minister). The Social Democrats had four ministers and held five ministries, as President Zeman refused to appoint Miroslav Poche, the party's nominee for Foreign Minister, and Jan Hamáček was appointed as acting Foreign Minister.

The coalition held 93 seats in the Chamber of Deputies, eight seats short of a simple majority of 101, and therefore required the support of another party to provide confidence and supply. KSČM agreed to support the minority government in exchange for cabinet support for several of their demands. With KSČM support, the government controlled a majority of 108 seats. On 15 June 2018, following approval in a referendum of party members, ČSSD formed a coalition with ANO.

The cabinet was approved by the Chamber of Deputies in the early morning of 12 July 2018 with a 105-91 vote, during a parliamentary session which had begun the previous morning. During the debate, deputies from TOP 09 left the Chamber in protest (they later returned to vote against the government), while some deputies from the Christian and Democratic Union – Czechoslovak People's Party unfurled a Soviet flag to protest against the government being supported by the Communist Party. Street protests also took place in Prague against the role of the Communists in the government.

Resignations over plagiarism

Shortly after the formation of the cabinet, two ministers (Taťána Malá of ANO and Petr Krčál of ČSSD) resigned after being accused of plagiarism in their bachelor theses.

On 24 July 2018, another minister, Lubomír Metnar (Independent for ANO) also came under suspicion of plagiarism in his diploma thesis.

Cabinet members

Popular mandate 
Support for governing parties according to the popular vote.

Confidence motion

Notes

References 

Andrej Babiš
ANO 2011
Czech Social Democratic Party
Czech government cabinets
2010s establishments in the Czech Republic
Cabinets established in 2018
2018 in the Czech Republic
Coalition governments of the Czech Republic
Cabinets disestablished in 2021
2017 Czech legislative election